Robert E. Pearson (January 31, 1928 – July 4, 2009) was a movie director, writer, and painter.  He was involved in over 100 films.

Early life
When Pearson was twelve years old, he left his hometown of Concordia, Kansas on a three-year trek to California to get into show business.  He had reportedly decided to make this trip himself after witnessing a band concert at Concordia High School when he was ten years old.

Movie career
In 1950, Pearson got his first big break when he met Norman Rice, who was hosting the weekly CBS radio show, This Is Our America.  He was hired to play seven characters on the show.  His work there led to minor roles in other movies.  Pearson also served as official videographer for stars receiving the Golden Palm Awards, including Mickey Rooney, James Earl Jones, and Robert Stack. In the early 1990s, Pearson also filmed and directed the entire classical musical videos of Jan Davis, guitarist, Davis' largest twelve video effort 'Concert by the Sea' available on 'You Tube'.

While in Hollywood, Peasron directed two films:  The Devil and LeRoy Bassett 
and Hawaiian Split.  The movie, The Devil and LeRoy Bassett starring Don Epperson premiered at the Brown Grand Theatre in Concordia, Kansas where Robert previously had lived.  This was the last movie to be shown at the theater before its restoration.

Paintings
Throughout his film and television career, Pearson wrote poetry and created art in his spare time.  He now lives in Clay Center, Kansas and paints oils and acrylics nearly every day and regularly exhibits his work in regional galleries.

Pearson has had Parkinson's disease for nearly a decade, is blind in his right eye and legally blind in his left eye—plus he has been color-blind his entire life.  This makes his ability to create paintings even more extraordinary.

Current life
As of 2004, a family member's obituary reported he was still living in Clay Center, Kansas.

He died on July 4, 2009 in Clay Center, Kansas.

References

External links 
 

2009 deaths
People from Concordia, Kansas
Writers from Kansas
American artists
People from Clay Center, Kansas
1928 births
Film directors from Kansas